Siegfried Borris (born Siegfried Jakob Boris Zuckermann; 4 November 1906 – 23 August 1987) was a German composer, musicologist and music educator. He became a lecturer at the Musikhochschule Berlin in 1929, but his career was interrupted during the Nazi regime. He was appointed professor in 1945 and became an influential pedagogue, composer of music for young players, and active in music organisations. He was president of national associations, of Deutscher Tonkünstlerverband from 1963 to 1972, and of Deutscher Musikrat from 1971 to 1976.

Life 
Siegfried Jakob Boris Zuckermann was born in Berlin on 4 November 1906, the son of the economist Salomo Zuckermann and his wife Martha, a teacher. His father was Jewish and had converted to Christianity when he married in 1905.

He initially studied national economics at the Humboldt University of Berlin as his father wished, but also studied music at the same time. In 1927, he was accepted in Paul Hindemith's composition class. From 1929, he additionally studied musicology. He obtained a doctorate in 1933, supervised by Arnold Schering. His dissertation was Kirnbergers Leben und Werk und seine Bedeutung im Berliner Musikkreis um 1750, about the life and influence of Johann Kirnberger.

As early as 1929, he worked as a lecturer at the Musikhochschule in Berlin. He was dismissed in 1933, at the instigation of the Kampfbund für deutsche Kultur under the Nazi regime. He then taught music privately. When the Nuremberg Laws of 1935 were enacted, he also lost his German citizenship which had been granted to him in 1925. He subsequently remained in statelessness until 1950.

After World War II, Borris returned to the Musikhochschule in Berlin, where he was appointed professor. He established and directed a teachers' seminary. He was made an emeritus in 1972. His focus was on topics such as school music, young musicians and the popularisation of contemporary music. He composed operas for schools and fairy-tale operas, and produced radio programs of new music. He became a member of the advisory board of the broadcaster Sender Freies Berlin. Borris was chairman of the new Institut für Neue Musik und Musikerziehung in Darmstadt from 1961 to 1972, also president of Verband Deutscher Musikerzieher und konzertierender Künstler, an association of German music educators and performers from 1963 to 1972, and in a leading position in the Arbeitsgemeinschaft Musikerziehung und Musikpflege. He was a member of the Deutscher Musikrat from 1964, serving as its president from 1971 to 1976.

Borris died in Berlin at the age of 80. He was buried in the Dahlem Cemetery. His grave was designated as a grave of honour in Berlin until 2014.

Honours 
 1972: Officer's Cross of the Order of Merit of the Federal Republic of Germany
 1981:  of Berlin.
 1986: Commander's Cross of the Order of Merit of the Federal Republic of Germany

Publications 
As a composer, Borris wrote five symphonies, suites and divertimento, a harpsichord concerto and a flute concerto, pieces for organ, and cantatas. Borris also wrote several works for mandolin orchestra. The main focus of his compositional work was in the field of youth opera and Spielmusik, music used in musical education. Borris also published numerous writings on music theory. His works and personal documents are held by the Academy of Arts, Berlin.

Operas 
 Hans im Glück, Funkoper, op. 40, Berlin: S. Borris, 1947
 Hirotas und Gerlinde, Funkoper, op. 41, Wilhelmshaven: Heinrichshofen’s, 1946
 Die Rübe, Eine heitere Märchenoper (nach Grimm), op. 56, Berlin: Sirius 1955
 Ruf des Lebens, Szenische Kantate, op. 72, Berlin: Sirius, 1954

Orchestral music 
 Concertino für Flöte und Streichorchester op. 71, Berlin: Sirius, [ca. 1950]
 Divertimento op. 31,3 für Streicher und 5 Bläser, Wilhelmshaven: Heinrichshofen’s
 Symphony No. 1 in B minor, op. 19 for orchestra, Berlin: Sirius, 1952
 Symphony No. 2 in E-flat major, op. 21
 Symphony No. 3 in A major, op. 29
 Symphony No. 4 in E major, op. 60
 Symphony No. 5 in C-sharp minor, op. 61
 Frühlingsgesellen op. 49
 Orchestersuite, op. 25
 Concertino for Englisch horn and string orchestra, op. 48, 1949
 Intrada for orchestra, op. 57
 Ländliche Suite – Spielmusik zum "Bruder Singer" for three wind instruments and string, 1954
 Konzert für Gambe, 3 Holzbläser und Streichorchester, op. 87
 Konzert für Orgel und kleines Orchester, op. 110
 Concerto for Orchestra in one movement, op. 112
 Konzert für Sopran Saxophon und Orchester, op. 120, 1966

Chamber music 
Partita for viola and cello, Op. 4, 1928, Berlin: Merkantil- und Musikalien-Druckerei Hannes Helm, zwischen 1939 und 1944 oder Berlin: S. Borris, 1947
Quartet for flute, violin, viola and cello, Op. 17 No. 2, Berlin: Sirius-Verlag, 1952
Bläserquintett (Wind Quintet), Op. 25 No. 2, Berlin: Sirius, 1946
Partita for flute, Op. 27 No. 1, Halle (Saale): Mitteldeutscher Verlag, 1951
Partita for two violins, Op. 27 No. 2, Leipzig: Friedrich Hofmeister, 1959
Sonata for piano in B minor, Op. 21, 1940
Sonata for flute and piano, Op. 22 No. 2, 1942, Berlin: Sirius, 1948
 3 Kleine Suiten (3 Little Suites) for piano, Op. 31, 1942, 1949–1950
Sonata in F for viola and piano, Op. 51 (published 1950)
 Villanellen for flute, violin and cello, Op. 97
Canzona for viola and organ (or harpsichord), Op. 110
Kleine Suite (Little Suite) for viola and piano

Vocal music 
Fahrtenkantate op. 54, 2, für gemischten Chor a cappella, Fassung für gemischten Chor, Instrumente ad libitum (3 Bläser, Streichquintett), Berlin: Sirius, [1950]
Frühlingsgesellen op. 49, Ein Liederspiel, Berlin: Sirius, 1950
Missa "Dona nobis pacem" op. 63 für gemischten Chor a cappella, Berlin: Sirius, 1955

School music 
Kleine Lieder für Karen-Isela, Berlin: A. Nauck & Co., 1945
Das grosse Spielbuch, 4 Bde., Leipzig: Peters, [1951–1954]

Poem collections 
Source:
 Herbstaufbruch, printed as manuscript, 47 pages, undated
 Der klingende Kreis, printed as manuscript, Berlin 1938
 Weg und Wende, printed as manuscript, 1941

Books 
Source:
 Beiträge zu einer neuen Musikkunde 1947/48
 Praktische Harmonielehre, Berlin (1938) 1950/1977
 Einführung in die moderne Musik Halle 1950

 Der Schlüssel zur Musik von heute. Düsseldorf, Wien: Econ-Verlag 1967
 Grundlagen einer musikalischen Umweltkunde. Wolfenbüttel, Zürich: Möseler 1975
 Kulturgut Musik als Massenware. Wiesbaden: Breitkopf & Härtel 1978

Notes

References

External links 
 
 
 Siegfried Borris Archive at the Akademie der Künste, Berlin
 
 

20th-century classical composers
20th-century German composers
20th-century German musicologists
German music educators
Humboldt University of Berlin alumni
Berlin University of the Arts alumni
Academic staff of the Berlin University of the Arts
Commanders Crosses of the Order of Merit of the Federal Republic of Germany
1906 births
1987 deaths
Musicians from Berlin
German people of Jewish descent
Stateless people
People who lost German citizenship